Arbetarkommun alt. Arbetarekommun (Labour Commune) is the municipal unit of Sveriges Socialdemokratiska Arbetareparti (Social Democratic Labour Party of Sweden). An arbetarkommun consists of several base level party units, workplace units, etc.

Historically the term had been used also by other socialist parties in Sweden. The Communist Party (SKP and later VPK), had a municipal units called Kommunistiska Arbetarkommuner (KAK, Communist Labour Communes). The break-away Arbetarpartiet Kommunisterna (Workers Party - Communists) and the revived SKP started by them has continued to call their local units KAKs.

The Socialistiska Partiet (Socialist Party) of Karl Kilbom and Nils Flyg had municipal units called Socialistiska Arbetarkommuner.

Swedish Social Democratic Party